Jasmine Leonora Guinness (born 28 September 1976) is an Irish designer and a fashion model active since 1994. She is also an heiress to the Guinness brewing fortune.

Personal life
She is the daughter of Patrick Guinness and Liz Casey. She was educated at St. Columba's College, Rathfarnham, in Dublin. She also spent a year at Winchester School of Art.

She and Gawain O'Dare Rainey were engaged on 31 January 2005 and married on 1 July 2006 in Leixlip, Ireland. The wedding was extensively covered in Hello! magazine (in the issue dated 18 July 2006) and attended by 500 guests, including the designer of her draped silk dress, Jasper Conran, Mario Testino, Paddy Moloney, Anjelica Huston, Jacquetta Wheeler, Jade Parfitt, Erin O'Connor, Garech Browne and Philip Treacy.

Her husband is the son of Michael Rainey and the Hon. Jane Ormsby-Gore, a daughter of David, 5th Lord Harlech. They have two sons and a daughter together.

Modelling career
A portrait of her is held at the National Portrait Gallery in London. She has modelled for various perfume and make-up campaigns, including Armani and Shu Uemura. She was the face of the "Goffs Million" horse races at the Curragh in September 2007, an event that paid the highest winnings of any race meeting in Europe.

In 2009 she was the face of the "Arthur's Day" event celebrating her ancestor Arthur Guinness. In March and December 2011 she was again the subject of articles in Hello.

2014 marked a revival of Guinness' modelling career as she led Jaeger's AW14 campaign alongside her mother Liz and fellow models Kirsty Hume and Jodie Kidd. Her range largely included knitwear; including cardigans, skirts and sweater dresses.

Family
Guinness is the great-granddaughter of Diana Mitford (later Lady Mosley), who was one of the Mitford sisters, and her first husband Bryan Guinness, later the 2nd Lord Moyne. Her paternal grandfather, the Hon. Desmond Guinness, was a conservationist specialising in Georgian and classical architecture, while her paternal grandmother, Mariga Guinness, was born Marie-Gabrielle, Princess of Urach. Desmond and Mariga Guinness were co-founders of the Irish Georgian Society. Guinness's maternal family was researched in the RTÉ programme Where Was Your Family During the Famine?

Ancestors

Notes

External links
Vogue story 2003
Daily Telegraph 2006

 
  Miss Jasmine Guinness at Debrett's People of Today
www.style.it 2007
Roberto Cavalli 2007

1976 births
Jasmine Guinness
People educated at St Columba's College, Dublin
Alumni of the University of Southampton
Irish female models
Irish people of German descent
Living people